Gábor Haraszti is a Hungarian sprint canoer who competed in the early 1970s. He won two medals in the C-2 10000 m event at the ICF Canoe Sprint World Championships with a silver in 1974 and a bronze in 1973.

References
 
 

Hungarian male canoeists
Living people
Year of birth missing (living people)
ICF Canoe Sprint World Championships medalists in Canadian
20th-century Hungarian people